Peter Frusetta (July 6, 1932 - February 26, 2020) was an American politician who served in the California State Assembly between 1994 and 2000.

Frusetta served in the United States Army between 1954 and 1956. He was deployed in Germany.

Frusetta first ran for the California State Assembly in 1992, but was defeated. Frusetta ran again in 1994 and won. Frusetta served for six years in the California State Assembly, before retiring in 2000.

References

Republican Party members of the California State Assembly
1932 births
2020 deaths